The Coastal Carolina Chanticleers men's soccer team represents Coastal Carolina University in all NCAA Division I men's college soccer competitions. The team competes in the Sun Belt Conference, following previous tenures in Conference USA and Big South Conference, both of which had been prior conference homes for that ream. During their Big South tenure, the Chanticleers were one of that league's more successful teams, both within the conference and in the NCAA Tournament. In 2003, the Chanticleers became the first Big South team to reach the final sixteen in the tournament.

Despite not having been a Big South member since the 2015 season, the Chanticleers still have the most regular season and tournament championships of any Big South team. The program has won 11 regular season and 12 tournament championships.

The Chanticleers won 4 out of 5 tournament championships during their tenure in Sun Belt men's soccer, with all 4 wins coming against Georgia State.

After the Sun Belt men's soccer league disbanded at the end of the 2020–21 school year, Coastal joined Conference USA (C-USA) for that sport. C-USA was already the men's soccer home of another in-state school, South Carolina, although the latter school's natural in-conference rival is Kentucky, given that Kentucky and South Carolina are full members of the Southeastern Conference. However, following a major conference realignment in 2021 brought several new men's soccer schools to the Sun Belt, that league announced it would reinstate men's soccer no later than 2023. The SBC later announced it would reinstate soccer in 2022, following the arrival of three new full members with men's soccer teams (James Madison, Marshall, Old Dominion).

Stadium 
Coastal Carolina University Soccer Field is home to CCU's men's and women's soccer programs. In 2003 the facility was the home of the first-ever NCAA Championship event hosted by Coastal Carolina University, as CCU's men's soccer team defeated Davidson, 3–0, in the opening round of the NCAA Men's Soccer Tournament.

Roster 

As of 2019

Team Management 

Coaching Staff

Head coaching history

List of seasons

Records and statistics

NCAA tournament results

Honors 
Big South Conference Coach of the Year
Paul Banta – 1986, 1987, 1989
Shaun Docking – 2002, 2003, 2007, 2011, 2012

Big South Conference Player of the Year
1990 Guy Norcott
1992 Eric Schmitt
1999 Mario Benjamin
2002 Joseph Ngwenya
2003 Joseph Ngwenya
2007 Mkhokheli Dube
2009 Djamel Bekka

Big South Conference Attacking Player of the Year
2011 Ashton Bennett
2012 Ashton Bennett
2013 Pedro Ribeiro

Big South Conference Defensive Player of the Year
2011 Cyprian Hedrick 
2012 Kjartan Sigurdsson
2013 Shawn McLaws

Notable alumni 

  Joseph Ngwenya
  Kheli Dube
  Mubarike Chisoni
  Jordan Hughes
  Tyler Hughes
  Boyzzz Khumalo
  Stu Riddle
  Pedro Ribeiro
  Tommy Rutter
  DZ Harmon

References

External links
 

 
Soccer clubs in South Carolina
1978 establishments in South Carolina
Association football clubs established in 1978